Clavatula diadema common name the diadem turrid, is a species of sea snail, a marine gastropod mollusk in the family Clavatulidae.

Description
The size of an adult shell varies between 14 mm and 38 mm. 
Shells typically have the opening on the right side. 
The shape of top of the shell is a steep cone with small rigid protrusions circling each layer.

Distribution
This species occurs in the Atlantic Ocean from Senegal to Angola.

References

 Kiener (1840). General species and iconography of recent shells : comprising the Massena Museum, the collection of Lamarck, the collection of the Museum of Natural History, and the recent discoveries of travellers,  pl. 8; f. 2; Boston :W.D. Ticknor,1837
 Bernard, P.A. (Ed.) (1984). Coquillages du Gabon [Shells of Gabon]. Pierre A. Bernard: Libreville, Gabon. 140, 75 plates pp.

External links
 

diadema
Gastropods described in 1840